Indian cherry is a common name for several plants and may refer to:
 Amelanchier canadensis
 Rhamnus caroliniana